Bostick is a surname.

Bostick may also refer to:

Places

United States
 Bostick, Texas, an unincorporated community
 Bostick School, a one-room schoolhouse near Ellerbe, North Carolina
 Bostick Female Academy, Triune, Tennessee
 Bostick State Prison, a former prison located in Hardwick in Baldwin County, Georgia

Elsewhere
 Forward Operating Base Bostick, a US military base in Afghanistan

See also
 Florida v. Bostick, a US Supreme Court case
 Bostik, an international adhesives company
 Bostock (disambiguation)